Rinconada is a rural municipality and village in Jujuy Province in Argentina. It is located in the west of the province of Jujuy and is the head of the Rinconada Department.

Due to its altitude of 3851 meters, it is the highest city of Argentina, taking into account those cities possessing municipal organization.

The village is accessed by a 62 km gravel road (Provincial Route 7) that starts 4 km north of Abra Pampa, on National Route 9.T
The Laguna de los Pozuelos, found along this route, contains 150 km² of protected area (Monumento Natural Laguna de los Pozuelos).

Climate
Rinconada has an alpine climate (Köppen ETH) with mean temperatures below  in all months.

Population
Taking into account its rural population, Rinconada is the most important town in the department with 1,352 inhabitants (INDEC, 2001), representing a decrease of 21.67% compared to 1645 inhabitants (INDEC, 1991) of the previous census.

Its urban, or clustered, population is only 364 inhabitants.

References

Populated places in Jujuy Province